King Alexander may refer to:

Royalty

Epirus 
 Alexander I of Epirus
 Alexander II of Epirus

Georgia 
 Alexander I of Georgia (1386–?)

Greece 
 Alexander of Greece (1893–1920)

Imereti 
 Alexander II of Imereti (died 1510)
 Alexander III of Imereti (1609–1660)

Kakheti
 Alexander II of Kakheti (1527–1605)

Scotland 
 Alexander I of Scotland (c. 1078–1124)
 Alexander II of Scotland (1198–1249)
 Alexander III of Scotland (1241–1286)

Serbia 
 Alexander I of Serbia (1876–1903), king of Serbia, son of Milan I

Yugoslavia 
 Alexander I of Yugoslavia (1888–1934)

Other
 F. King Alexander, college president
 King Alexander palm, Archontophoenix alexandrae

See also
 Alexander King (disambiguation)
 Alexander of Macedon (disambiguation)
 Alexander of Scotland (disambiguation)
 Alexander I (disambiguation)
 Alexander II (disambiguation)
 Alexander III (disambiguation)